Derek Kern (born September 1, 1978) is an American former professional roller hockey and ice hockey player. Kern was a member of the United States national inline hockey team that competed at the 2007 and 2008 IIHF Men's InLine Hockey World Championships. Kern played professional roller hockey with the Mission Snipers.

Early life and education 
Kern was born in Smithtown, New York. Prior to turning professional, he attended the State University of New York at Oswego, where he played four seasons.

Career 
Kern played the 2004–05 season with the Kansas City Outlaws of the United Hockey League. On January 24, 2009, Kern was signed by the Brooklyn Aces of the EPHL. Since retiring from hockey, Kern has served in the New York City Fire Department.

References

External links

1978 births
Living people
American men's ice hockey centers
Bossier-Shreveport Mudbugs players
Brooklyn Aces players
Kansas City Outlaws players
Ice hockey players from New York (state)